KCTX (1510 kHz, "The Cat") is a n AM radio station broadcasting a hot adult contemporary music format. Licensed to Childress, Texas, United States. The station is currently owned by James G. Boles, Jr. and features programming from TSN Radio and locally originated programming.

KCTX programming is also heard on translator K221FL at 92.1 FM, also licensed to Childress, hence the former station name of "K92." The station is now imaged as "The Cat" despite still airing "K92" jingles.

1510 AM is a United States clear-channel frequency;  WLAC in Nashville, Tennessee is the dominant Class A station on this frequency.  KCTX must leave the air from sunset to sunrise in order to protect the nighttime skywave signal of WLAC.

References

External links

CTX
Hot adult contemporary radio stations in the United States
CTX